Creverina is a frazione of Isola del Cantone in Italy in the province of Genoa in the Liguria region.

According to the 2011 assessment. In the settlement lived 30 inhabitants.  The settlement is at Altitude of 312 m.

References

External links 

 by the CIA Factbook
 Italian Railways
 Italian National and Regional Parks
 History of Italy: Primary Documents
 List and maps of archaeological sites in Italy
 WWW-VL: History: Italy at IUE

Frazioni of the Province of Genoa